Kyneton Airport  is located in Kyneton, Victoria, Australia. The airfield is located 550 metres northwest of the town.

Home of the Kyneton Aero Club and the Sports Aircraft Association of Australia Chapter 20, the airfield is managed by the Kyneton Aero Club on behalf of the Shire of Macedon Ranges. Football club at the airfield

See also
 List of airports in Victoria

References

External links
 Official website

Airports in Victoria (Australia)
Kyneton, Victoria